The 1977–78 Scottish Second Division was won by Clyde who, along with second placed Raith Rovers, were promoted to the First Division. Brechin City finished bottom.

Table

References 

 Rsssf

Scottish Second Division seasons
3
Scot